Mille Pattes Records is a Canadian independent record label formed in Quebec. It distributes the music of two of the best known Trad bands of Quebec: La Bottine Souriante and Les Batinses.

Noted artists
La Bottine Souriante
Les Batinses

See also

Music of Quebec
List of Quebec record labels
List of record labels

External links
Mille Pattes Records Official site

Quebec record labels
Canadian independent record labels
Folk record labels